The U.S. Department of Veterans Affairs Office of Inspector General (VA OIG) is one of the Inspector General offices created by the Inspector General Act of 1978. The Inspector General for the Department of Veterans Affairs is charged with investigating and auditing department programs to combat waste, fraud, and abuse.

History of Inspectors General

References 

Veterans Affairs Office of Inspector General, Department of
United States Department of Veterans Affairs